Katrenikona is a village in Dr. B.R. Ambedkar Konaseema district of the Indian state of Andhra Pradesh. It is located in Katrenikona Mandal of Amalapuram revenue division of the district.

References 

Villages in Konaseema district
Mandal headquarters in Konaseema district